Katerina Giota (born July 3, 1990 in St. Petersburg, Russia) is a female professional volleyball player from Greece, who is a member of the Greece women's national volleyball team. At club level, she plays in Hellenic Volley League for Greek powerhouse Olympiacos Piraeus since July 2013.

Career 
Katerina Giota in 2002 moved with her mother from Russia to Greece at an age of 12 years old and they were established in the Greek city Grevena, where she obtained the Hellenic citizenship. From her younger age, she was engaged in swimming, so she continued in Greece, but some day she was spotted by coach Memtsas and was persuaded to try volleyball. In this way she started her rich career in volleyball, which was to lead her into one of the best ever central blockers in the history of the certain sport in Greece.

Thus in 2004 she joined G.S. Grevena, a club of her hometown, where she remained up to 2006 when she removed to 1st division A.S. Aris Thessaloniki. Two more years in Aris until her transfer to G.S. Iraklis Kifisia. With this club Katerina Giota won twice the 3rd place of the Hellenic Championship.

In 2013 Olympiacos managed to convince Katerina Giota to be a member of the Piraeus club, after three failed attempts. Until then Giota used to wear her favourite No 13 on her shirt, in every of her previous teams. But in her new club she was told that this number does not exist in any of Olympiacos sport sections, as it represents their hot rivals from Athens. So, Katerina Giota chose the No 1 shirt, and kept the No 13 only for the Hellenic National Squad.

Since then Katerina Giota has won at international level with Olympiacos Piraeus the golden medal of the 2017–18 CEV Women's Challenge Cup, being the best blocker of that competition with 33 winning block points and the silver medal of the 2016–17 CEV Women's Challenge Cup as well.
In domestic competitions, Giota has won 7 Hellenic Championships and 6 Hellenic Cups, being all these years a permanent member of her squad as central blocker.

In January 2021 the Greek championship was uncertain whether it would continue due to covid-19 disease, and Olympiacos allowed their players to move abroad (despite their contracts) until next summer. Thus, Katerina Giota signed in Vasas SC Budapest, with which she won the 3rd place of the Hungarian championship 2020-21.

International career 
In 2006, at the age of 16 Katerina Giota, when she was playing for Aris Thessaloniki, was selected for the Hellenic Junior Women's National team, but her first European appearance took place in the preliminary round of the 2008 Junior Women European Championship.

Since 2010 she is a member of the Hellenic Women's National Team with participation in the preliminary round of the 2011 European Championship, and she remains a basic member of the National Squad up to now, having competed in the Mediterranean Games of 2013 and 2018, as well as in any other competition, such as the preliminary  or final stages of European and World Championships, in the European League and in many friendlies as well. In 2015 and in 2016 Katerina Giota won the bronze medal in Golden European League, and in 2018 Mediterranean Games she won the silver medal as a permanent member of the Hellenic National Team.

Sporting achievements

National Team
 2015  European Golden League
 2016  European Golden League
 2018  Mediterranean Games

Clubs

International competitions
 2016/2017  CEV Women's Challenge Cup, with Olympiacos S.F. Piraeus
 2017/2018  CEV Women's Challenge Cup, with Olympiacos S.F. Piraeus

National championships
 2013/2014  Hellenic Championship, with Olympiacos Piraeus
 2014/2015  Hellenic Championship, with Olympiacos Piraeus
 2015/2016  Hellenic Championship, with Olympiacos Piraeus
 2016/2017  Hellenic Championship, with Olympiacos Piraeus
 2017/2018  Hellenic Championship, with Olympiacos Piraeus
 2018/2019  Hellenic Championship, with Olympiacos Piraeus
 2019/2020  Hellenic Championship, with Olympiacos Piraeus

National trophies
 2013/2014  Hellenic Cup, with Olympiacos Piraeus
 2014/2015  Hellenic Cup, with Olympiacos Piraeus
 2015/2016  Hellenic Cup, with Olympiacos Piraeus
 2016/2017  Hellenic Cup, with Olympiacos Piraeus
 2017/2018  Hellenic Cup, with Olympiacos Piraeus
 2018/2019  Hellenic Cup, with Olympiacos Piraeus

Individuals
 2015/16 Hellenic Championship - Main period: MVP
 2014/15 Hellenic Championship - Main period: League All stars squad
 2012/13 Hellenic Championship - 4th day: MVP
 2014/15 Hellenic Championship - 21st day: MVP
 2016/17 Hellenic Championship - 12th day: MVP
 2017/18 CEV Women's Challenge Cup: Best blocker

References

External links
 profile at cev.eu
 profile at women.volleybox.net
 profile at greekvolley.eu 
 Olympiacos Women's Volleyball team at Olympiacos official web site (www.olympiacossfp.gr)
 Olympiacos Women's Volleyball team roster at CEV web site
 Hellenic Women National Team - caps www.volleyball.gr

1990 births
Living people
Olympiacos Women's Volleyball players
Greek women's volleyball players
Greek people of Russian descent
Mediterranean Games silver medalists for Greece
Mediterranean Games medalists in volleyball
Competitors at the 2018 Mediterranean Games
Sportspeople from Saint Petersburg
Sportspeople from Grevena